Patriot High School is a high school in Jurupa Valley, California, and is part of the Jurupa Unified School District. It accommodates students of the 9th to 12th grades. It is one of four high schools in the Jurupa Unified School District along with Jurupa Valley High School, Rubidoux High School and Nueva Vista.

History
Boys Basketball won Division IV CIF Southern Section Championship. 

The Cardinal Regiment, in 2009 were silver medalists in their division and in 2010, the band won first place gold as 2A Champions of SCSBOA. Again in the year 2011, the band moved up to compete in 3A and received the Silver Medal for SCSBOA. In 2013 the band returned to Division 2A and again ended the year as champions. Again in the 2A division, the band a silver medal in 2016 and a bronze in 2019. 

Patriot high schools winterguard has also received medals in WGASC competition. The JV in 2018 received silver medals in HSA division. The single team guard received a gold medal in HSA division in 2019. During the 2020 season they moved up divisions.

Girls volleyball, under head coach Victor Centeno, has won multiple league titles and in 2011 placed eighth, reaching the quarter-finals in CIF-SS volleyball.

External links
Patriot High School Official Website

References 

Educational institutions established in 2007
High schools in Riverside County, California
Jurupa Valley, California
Public high schools in California
2007 establishments in California